The list of NCAA major college football team yearly scoring leaders identifies the NCAA major college team scoring leaders.  Beginning with the 1937 college football season.

Scoring leaders since 1937

Pre-1937 unofficial data 
Before 1937 the NCAA did not compile official statistics. This chart reflects unofficial scoring statistics for years prior to 1937.

References

Scoring